The 2007 Yau Tsim Mong District Council election was held on 18 November 2007 to elect all 16 elected members to the 20-member District Council.

Overall election results
Before election:

Change in composition:

References

2007 Hong Kong local elections